Rochford is a town and civil parish in the Rochford District in Essex, England,  north of Southend-on-Sea,  from London and  from Chelmsford. At the 2011 census, the civil parish had a population of 8,471.

History
The town is the main settlement in the Rochford district, and takes its name from Rochefort, Old English for ‘Ford of the Hunting Dogs’. The River Roach was originally called the Walfleet (‘Creek of the foreigners’). It was renamed the Roach in what is known as a back formation. This is where it is assumed that Rochford means ford over the River Roach so they renamed the river to fit the theory. The town runs into suburban developments in the parishes of Ashingdon and Hawkwell. Kings Hill, in Rochford, was notable for containing the Lawless Court up until the 19th century.

Peculiar People
In 1837 James Banyard  (14 November 1800 – 1863) (a reformed drunk and Wesleyan preacher) and William Bridges (1802–1874) took a lease on the old workhouse at Rochford, which became the first chapel of the Peculiar People, a name taken from Deuteronomy 14:2 and 1 Peter 2:9. The Peculiar People practised a lively form of worship bound by the literal interpretation of the King James Bible, banning both frivolity and medicine. During the two World Wars some were conscientious objectors, believing that war is contrary to the teachings of Jesus Christ. The Peculiar People are nowadays known as the Union of Evangelical Churches,

James Banyard was buried in the graveyard of St Andrew's, Rochford.

First World War
Training continued until May 1915 when the site, known also as Eastwood, was taken over by the RNAS to become a Station (night) in the fight against intruding Zeppelins.

Second World War
Southend Airport was opened on the site on 18 September 1935. As World War II approached it was requisitioned by the Air Ministry in August 1939 for use as a fighter airfield by No.11 Group RAF. RAF Rochford was a satellite station for RAF Hornchurch and was primarily a fighter base, home mainly to Supermarine Spitfire and Hawker Hurricane aircraft. Due to the presence of the airfield Rochford was bombed a number of times during the war. 

It was returned to civilian service on 31 December 1946.

Geography

The town is just to the north of Southend-on-Sea, but is sufficiently separated from both Southend and Rayleigh and continues to preserve its own identity.

Governance
The Member of Parliament for Rochford and Southend East is James Duddridge (Conservative). An electoral ward in the same name exists. At the 2011 Census this ward had a population of 7,695.

Landmarks

Rochford Hall is partly privately owned by a family which live within the building, along with the golf course who also own a part of it as their clubhouse. In 1525, Henry VIII awarded Thomas Boleyn the title of Viscount Rochford. Rochford Hall subsequently became the home of Mary Boleyn, sometime mistress of Henry VIII and (probably elder) sister of Queen Anne Boleyn, during Mary's second marriage to Sir William Stafford.

Leisure
Rochford Council are in partnership with Virgin Active in running Clements Hall Leisure Centre and Rayleigh Leisure Centre.

Sport
Rochford Hundred Rugby Club was formed in 1962 and as of 2019 play in London & South East Premier—level 5 of the English rugby union system.

Rochford Town Football Club are a non-league side who play in the second division of the Essex Olympian Football League.

Rankin’s Cricket Club was established in 1881 and play in the T Rippon Mid Essex League.

Transport

Trains run from Rochford railway station eastbound to Southend Victoria and westbound to Liverpool Street station in the business district of central London. As a consequence, Rochford has long been popular as a dormitory town for commuters.  Southend Airport railway station, which is sited on the eastern boundary of the airport, opened on 18 July 2011.

Rochford has bus links to the surrounding towns; routes 7, 8 and 9 travel to Rayleigh and Southend-on-Sea.

There are over twenty scheduled flight destinations within Europe available from London Southend Airport.

Rochford Hospital
Rochford Hospital used to be primarily the district maternity hospital. It was here, in 1956, that Sister J Ward made observations that led to the development of phototherapy for newborns suffering from jaundice.

Rochford Hospital was officially opened on Thursday 7 May 2009 by Professor Louis Appleby.

Churches

St Andrew's Church, Rochford, is close to Rochford Hall, and is part of Rochford Deanery, within the Bradwell Area of the Church of England Diocese of Chelmsford.

Rochford Congregational Church has been part of the local community since 1750. The Congregational Church also established the first Dissenting School in the area; When others were afraid of educating the children of the lower classes because they might prove a danger to the state, the church ensured that ordinary people had "a plain and useful education."  

Rochford Methodist Church, near the White Horse Public House. The Methodists have been in Rochford since 1822, originally meeting in a building where Market Alley turns into the Square. In 1841 they moved to a new building in North Street near Weir Pond Road, and in 1880 they moved to their current premises.

Rochford Community Church was founded in 1987 and meets at The Freight House near the railway station.

There is also a small Roman Catholic church in Rochford, St Teresa of the child Jesus.

Notable people

Jamie Cullum, jazz-pop musician
Terry Alderton, comedian and former footballer
Peter Allen, journalist and radio presenter
Barrie Delf, professional footballer
Digby Fairweather, jazz musician
Brenda Forbes, Anglo-American actress of stage and screen
Philip Guard, actor
Dean Macey, athlete
Mike Penning, Conservative MP
Richard Rich, 1st Baron Rich, Lord Chancellor under Edward VI, died in Rochford 12 June 1567
Rachel Riley, TV presenter and mathematician, born in Rochford but raised in Thorpe Bay, Southend-on-Sea
Will Stevens, racing driver
Amanda Tapping, actress, producer and director best known for playing Samantha "Sam" Carter on the Canadian/American sci-fi shows, "Stargate SG-1" franchise  was born in Rochford before moving to Canada with her family.
Andrew Tyrie, Conservative MP
Omar Abdullah, former Chief Minister, Jammu and Kashmir, India
James Bourne, Singer and guitarist for band McBusted
Paul Stephenson (civil rights campaigner), Leader of the Bristol Bus Boycott
Matthew Yates, athlete

References

External links
 Rochford Historic Town Project Assessment Report 

Towns in Essex
Civil parishes in Essex
Rochford District